Mozdoksky District (Mæzdædžy rajon) is an administrative and municipal district (raion), one of the eight in the Republic of North Ossetia–Alania, Russia. It is located in the north of the republic. Its administrative center is the town of Mozdok. Population:  88,634 (2002 Census);  The population of Mozdok accounts for 45.8% of the district's total population.

References

Notes

Sources

Districts of North Ossetia–Alania